Najmeh Khedmati (born June 9, 1996) is an Iranian female sport shooter. She qualified to represent Iran at the 2020 Summer Olympics in the women's 10 metre air rifle event.

Major achievements
Senior
2014 Asian Games, Incheon –  (AR40),  (AR40 team)
2015 Universiade, Gwangju –  (AR40),  (STR3X20 team),  (STR3X20),  (AR40 team),  (STR60PR team)
2015 ISSF World Cup, Qabala –  (AR40)
2016 Asian Airgun Championships, Tehran –  (AR40 team)
2019 Universiade, Naples –  (ARMIX)
2019 Asian Championships, Doha –  (AR60 team)
Junior
2014 World Championships, Granada –  (AR40 team)
2013 Asian Airgun Championships, Tehran –  (STR60PR team),  (STR3X20 team)
2015 Asian Airgun Championships, New Delhi –  (AR40),  (AR40 team)
2015 Asian Championships, Kuwait City –  (STR3X20),  (AR40 team),  (STR3X20 team),  (STR60PR team),  (STR60PR)
Youth
2012 Asian Airgun Championships, Nanchang –  (AR40)
2013 Asian Airgun Championships, Tehran –  (AR40),  (AR40 team)
2014 Asian Airgun Championships, Kuwait City –  (AR40),  (AR40 team)

References

External links
ISSF Profile

1996 births
Living people
Iranian female sport shooters
Asian Games gold medalists for Iran
Asian Games silver medalists for Iran
Asian Games medalists in shooting
Shooters at the 2014 Asian Games
Shooters at the 2018 Asian Games
Olympic shooters of Iran
Shooters at the 2016 Summer Olympics
Medalists at the 2014 Asian Games
Universiade medalists in shooting
Universiade gold medalists for Iran
Universiade silver medalists for Iran
Universiade bronze medalists for Iran
Medalists at the 2015 Summer Universiade
Medalists at the 2019 Summer Universiade
Islamic Solidarity Games competitors for Iran
Islamic Solidarity Games medalists in shooting
Shooters at the 2020 Summer Olympics
People from Birjand
20th-century Iranian women
21st-century Iranian women